Oxetocyon ("beginning dog") is an extinct monospecific genus of  the Borophaginae subfamily of canids native to North America. Fossils have been found in Nebraska and South Dakota.

Fossils of Oxetocyon are rare and, as a result, the genus is poorly known, and only the teeth, dentaries, and a fragmentary skull have been reported. The teeth of Oxetocyon indicate a hypocarnivorous diet, as is found in the living raccoon dog, and suggest a potential relationship to the unusual borophagine Otarocyon. Oxetocyon is distinguished from Otarocyon by its own set of dental specializations for an omnivorous diet, particularly by the presence of a cleft that divides each upper molar into front and back halves.

References

Borophagines
Oligocene canids
Paleogene mammals of North America
Prehistoric carnivoran genera
Fossil taxa described in 1954